Gianfranco Alberto Labarthe Tomé (born 20 September 1984 in Lima) is a Peruvian footballer who plays as a striker.

Career
He played briefly for English Football League clubs Huddersfield Town and Derby County. He also had a trial at Shrewsbury Town. He then moved back to Peru where he played for Sport Boys for three seasons and then signed with Universitario.

On 9 May 2015 he scored his first goal with Deportivo Municipal, an impressive right-footed volley against Universidad San Martín de Porres.

Honours

Club
Universitario de Deportes
 Apertura: 2008
 Torneo Descentralizado: 2009

References

External links
 
 

1984 births
Living people
Footballers from Lima
Peruvian footballers
Peruvian expatriate footballers
Peru international footballers
Association football forwards
Huddersfield Town A.F.C. players
Derby County F.C. players
Coronel Bolognesi footballers
Sport Boys footballers
Club Universitario de Deportes footballers
Club Deportivo Universidad de San Martín de Porres players
Apollon Limassol FC players
Universidad Técnica de Cajamarca footballers
Deportivo Municipal footballers
Real Garcilaso footballers
Sport Huancayo footballers
Academia Deportiva Cantolao players
Deportivo Coopsol players
English Football League players
Peruvian Primera División players
Cypriot First Division players
Peruvian expatriate sportspeople in England
Peruvian expatriate sportspeople in Cyprus
Expatriate footballers in England
Expatriate footballers in Cyprus